This list of the Mesozoic life of Kansas contains the various prehistoric life-forms whose fossilized remains have been reported from within the US state of Kansas and are between 252.17 and 66 million years of age.

A

 †Abietites
 †Abietites ernestinae
 †Abietites longifolius
  †Acanthoscaphites – tentative report
 †Acanthoscaphites reesidei
 †Alzadasaurus – type locality for genus
 †Alzadasaurus kansasensis – type locality for species
 †Amberleya
  †Ampullina
  †Anomia
 †Apateodus
 †Apateodus busseni – type locality for species
  †Apatornis
 †Apatornis celer – type locality for species
  †Apsopelix
 †Apsopelix anglicus
 †Aquatifolia
 †Aquatifolia fluitans
 Aralia
 †Aralia newberryi
 †Aralia polymorpha
 †Aralia ravniana
 †Araliopsoides
 †Araliopsoides cretacea
 †Arcellites
 †Arcellites disciformis
 †Archaeanthus – type locality for genus
 †Archaeanthus linnenbergeri – type locality for species
 †Archaeolamna
 †Archaeolamna kopingensis
 †Archaepetala – type locality for genus
 †Archaepetala beekeri – type locality for species
 †Archaepetala obscura – type locality for species
 †Arcopagella
 †Arcopagella mactroides
 †Ariadnaesporites
 †Ariadnaesporites ariadnae
 Arundo
 †Arundo groenlandica
 †Asplenium
 †Asplenium dicksonianum
 †Astrocoenia
 †Astrocoenia nidiformis
  †Aviculopecten
 †Aviculopecten occidentalis

B

  †Baculites
 †Baculites clinolobatus
 †Baculites compressus
 †Baculites grandis
 †Baculites ovatus
 †Baculites pseudovatus – type locality for species
 †Bacutriletes
 †Bacutriletes greenlandicus
  †Bananogmius
 †Bananogmius evolutus
 †Baptornis – type locality for genus
 †Baptornis advenus – type locality for species
 †Bassites – type locality for genus
 †Bassites reesidei – type locality for species
 Botula
 †Botula carolinensis
  †Brachauchenius – type locality for genus
 †Brachauchenius lucasi – type locality for species
 Brachidontes
 †Brachidontes nonbifurcus
 †Brachyrhizodus
 †Brachyrhizodus mcnultyi
 †Brasenites
 †Brasenites kansense
 †Breviarca
 †Breviarca angulata
 †Breviarca habita
 †Breviarca salinaensis
 †Breviarca subovata

C

 Cadulus
 †Cadulus praetenuis
 †Caloda – type locality for genus
 †Caloda delevoryana – type locality for species
  †Calycoceras
 †Calycoceras naviculare
 †Cantioscyllium
 †Cantioscyllium decipiens
 Carcharias
 †Carcharias amonensis
 †Carcharias saskatchewanensis
 †Carcharias tenuiplicatus
 Cardita
 †Cardita belviderensis
 †Carpolithus
 †Carpolithus belviderensis
 †Cassiope
 †Ceratophyllum
 Chiloscyllium
 †Chiloscyllium greeni
 †Chondrites
  †Cimolichthys
 †Cimolichthys nepaholica
  Cladophlebis
 †Cladophlebis dakotensis
 †Claosaurus
 †Claosaurus agilis – type locality for species
  †Clidastes
 †Clidastes liodontus
 †Clidastes velox
 Cliona
 †Clioscaphites
 †Clioscaphites choteauensis
 †Collignoniceras
 †Collignoniceras woollgari
 †Coniasaurus
 †Coniasaurus crassidens – or unidentified comparable form
 Corbula
 †Corbula fenti
 †Corbula smolanensis
 †Costatheca
 †Costatheca diskoensis
 †Costatheca lata
 †Crassatellina
 †Crassatellina oblonga
 Crassinella
 †Crassinella semicostata
 Crassostrea
 †Crassostrea kiowana
  †Cretolamna
 †Cretolamna appendiculata
   †Cretoxyrhina
 †Cretoxyrhina mantelli
 †Crossopodia
 Ctenochelys
 †Ctenochelys procax
 †Ctenochelys stenoporus – type locality for species
 Cucullaea
 †Cucullaea herculea
 †Cucullaea recedens
 †Cupressinoxylon
 †Cupressinoxylon cheyennense
 †Cycadeoidea
 †Cycadeoidea munita
 †Cycadeospermum
 †Cycadeospermum lineatum
 †Cyprimeria
 †Cyprimeria kiowana
 Cytheridea

D

 †Dakotasuchus – type locality for genus
 †Dakotasuchus kingi – type locality for species
 †Dawndraco – type locality for genus
 †Dawndraco kanzai – type locality for species
  †Desmatochelys
 †Desmatochelys lowi
 †Dictyothylakos
  †Discoscaphites
 †Discoscaphites constrictus
 †Discoscaphites nicoletti
  †Dolichorhynchops – type locality for genus
 †Dolichorhynchops osborni – type locality for species
 †Donlesia
 †Donlesia dakotensis
 †Drepanocheilus
 †Drepanocheilus kiowanus
 †Durania
 †Durania maxima

E

  †Ectenosaurus
 †Ectenosaurus clidastoides
 †Eiffellithus
 †Eiffellithus turriseiffelii
  †Elasmosaurus – type locality for genus
 †Elasmosaurus nobilis – type locality for species
 †Elasmosaurus platyurus – type locality for species
 †Elasmosaurus sternbergi – type locality for species
  †Enchodus
 †Enchodus gladiolus
 †Enchodus petrosus
 †Engonoceras
 †Engonoceras belviderense
 †Eprolithus
 †Eprolithus floralis
 †Erlansonisporites
 †Erlansonisporites erlansonii
 †Euspira
 †Euspira smolanensis

F

 †Fagus
 †Feistmantelia
 †Feistmantelia oblonga
 †Flaventia
 †Flaventia belviderensis
 †Fumicollis – type locality for genus
 †Fumicollis hoffmani – type locality for species

G

 †Gegania
 †Gervillia
 †Gervillia mudgeana
 †Gervillia mudgenana
  †Gillicus
 †Gillicus arcuatus
 Gleichenia
 †Gleichenia bohemica
 †Gleichenia nordenskioldi
  †Globidens
 †Gryphaea
 †Gryphaea corrugata
 †Gryphaea hilli
 †Gryphaea mucronata
 †Gryphaea navia

H

 †Hadrodus
 †Hadrodus priscus
  †Halisaurus
 †Halisaurus sternbergi – type locality for species
 †Heliocolithus
 †Heliocolithus trabeculatus
 †Henrisporites
 †Henrisporites angustus
  †Hesperornis – type locality for genus
 †Hesperornis crassipes – type locality for species
 †Hesperornis gracilis – type locality for species
 †Hesperornis regalis – type locality for species
 †Heteroceras
 †Heteroceras tortum
 †Hierosaurus – type locality for genus
 †Hierosaurus sternbergii – type locality for species
 †Homomya
 †Hoploscaphites
 †Hoploscaphites nicolletii
 †Hughesisporites
 †Huhatanka
 †Huhatanka kiowana

I

 †Iaceornis
 †Iaceornis marshi – type locality for species
  †Ichthyornis – type locality for genus
 †Ichthyornis dispar – type locality for species
 †Inoceramus
 †Inoceramus cuvieri
 †Inoceramus ginterensis
 †Inoceramus tenuistriatus – tentative report
 †Ischyrhiza
 †Ischyrhiza mira

J

  †Jeletzkytes
 †Jeletzkytes nodosus

K

 †Kalymmanthus – type locality for genus
 †Kalymmanthus walkeri – type locality for species

L

 †Laminospondylus
 †Laminospondylus transversus – or unidentified comparable form
 †Leiosphaeridia
 †Leptosolen
 †Leptosolen otterensis
 †Leptostyrax
 †Leptostyrax crassidens
 †Lesqueria
 †Lesqueria elocata
 †Linearis
 †Linearis kansasensis
 †Lingula
 †Lingula subspatula
 †Lingula subspatulata
  Linuparus
 †Linuparus canadensis
 †Liriophyllum
 †Liriophyllum kansense – type locality for species
  Lopha
 †Lopha kansasensis
 †Lopha subovata
 †Lophochelys – type locality for genus
 †Lophochelys natatrix – type locality for species
 †Lophochelys niobrarae – type locality for species

M

 †Maexisporites
 †Maexisporites soldanellus
 †Magnoavipes
 Marsilea
 †Marsilea johnhallii
 †Mathilda
   †Megacephalosaurus – type locality for genus
 †Megacephalosaurus eulerti – type locality for species
 Membranipora
 †Microcarpolithes
 †Microcarpolithes hexagonalis
 †Minerisporites
 †Minerisporites dissimilis
 †Minerisporites marginatus
 †Minerisporites pterotus – or unidentified comparable form
  †Modiolus
 †Molaspora
 †Molaspora lobata
 †Molaspora salinum – type locality for species
 †Mytiloides
 †Mytiloides columbianus

N

 †Niobrarasaurus
 †Niobrarasaurus coleii – type locality for species
 †Niobrarateuthis
 †Niobrarateuthis bonneri – type locality for species
 †Niobrarateuthis walkeri – type locality for species
 Nucula
 †Nucula catherina
 †Nucula rivulana – or unidentified comparable form
 Nuculana
 †Nuculana mutata
  †Nyctosaurus
 †Nyctosaurus bonneri – type locality for species
 †Nyctosaurus gracilis – type locality for species
 †Nyctosaurus nanus – type locality for species

O

 †Ogmodirus – type locality for genus
 †Ogmodirus martinii – type locality for species
 †Onychiopsis
 †Onychiopsis psilotoides
 †Orepanochilus
 †Orepanochilus kiowanus
  Ostrea
 †Ostrea arcuata
 †Ostrea lugubris
 †Ostrea rugosa
 †Otostoma
 †Oxytropidoceras

P

 †Pachyrhizodus
 †Pachyrhizodus caninus – or unidentified comparable form
 †Pachyrhizodus minimus
 †Parahesperornis – type locality for genus
 †Parahesperornis alexi – type locality for species
 †Paraliodesmus
 †Paraliodesmus guadagnii
 †Paxillitriletes
 †Paxillitriletes dakotaensis
 †Paxillitriletes vittatus
 †Pecten
 †Pecten inconspicuus
 †Peilinia
 †Peilinia quadriplicata
 †Phelopteria
 †Phelopteria minuta
 Pholadomya
 †Pholadomya belviderensis
 Pinus
 †Pinus longifolius
 †Pirsila
 †Placenticeras
 †Placenticeras meeki
 Platanus
  †Platecarpus
 †Platecarpus planifrons – type locality for species
 †Platecarpus tympaniticus
  †Platyceramus
 †Platyceramus platinus
 †Platypterygius – or unidentified comparable form
 †Plesiochelys
 †Plesiochelys belviderensis – type locality for species
 †Plesiosaurus
 †Plesiosaurus gulo – type locality for species
 Plicatula
 †Polyacrodus – report made of unidentified related form or using admittedly obsolete nomenclature
  †Polycotylus – type locality for genus
 †Polycotylus latipinnis – type locality for species
 †Porthochelys – type locality for genus
 †Porthochelys laticeps – type locality for species
 †Prionochelys
 †Prionochelys galeotergum – type locality for species
 †Prionocyclus
 †Prionocyclus hyatti
 †Prisca – tentative report
 †Protocardia
 †Protocardia texana
  †Protosphyraena
 †Protosphyraena tenuis
  †Protostega
 †Protostega copei – type locality for species
 †Pseudoperna
 †Pseudoperna bentonensis
 †Pseudoperna congesta
  †Pteranodon – type locality for genus
 †Pteranodon comptus – type locality for species
 †Pteranodon longiceps – type locality for species
 †Pteranodon sternbergi – type locality for species
 †Pteria
 †Pteria salinensis
 †Pterotrigonia
 †Pterotrigonia emoryi
  †Ptychodus
 †Ptychodus anonymus – or unidentified comparable form
 †Ptychodus decurrens
 †Ptychodus mortoni
 †Ptychodus occidentalis
 †Ptychodus whipplei
 †Ptychotrygon
 †Ptychotrygon triangularis

Q

 Quercus

R

 †Raninella
 †Raninella carlilensis
 †Repichnia
  Rhinobatos
 †Rhinobatos incertus
 †Rhizocorallium
 †Ruffordia
 †Ruffordia goepperti – or unidentified comparable form

S

 †Sapindopsis
 †Sapindopsis belviderensis
 †Sapindopsis brevifolia
 †Sapindopsis magnifolia
 †Sapindopsis type A – informal
 †Sapindopsis type B – informal
 †Sapindopsis variabilis
 Sassafras
 †Sassafras mudgii
 †Sassafras mudgli
 †Scabratriletes
 †Scabtrigonia
 †Scabtrigonia emoryi
  †Scapanorhynchus
 †Scapanorhynchus rhaphiodon
 †Scaphites
 †Scaphites plenus
 †Scolicia
 Scyliorhinus
 †Selmasaurus
 †Selmasaurus johnsoni – type locality for species
  †Sequoia
 †Sequoia condita
 Serpula
  †Silvisaurus – type locality for genus
 †Silvisaurus condrayi – type locality for species
 †Spermatites
 †Spermatites piperiformis
  Squalicorax
 †Squalicorax curvatus
 †Squalicorax falcatus
 †Squalicorax kaupi
 †Squalicorax pristodontus – or unidentified comparable form
 †Squalicorax volgensis
 †Squalocorax
 Sterculia
 †Sterculia mucronata
 †Sterculia towneri
 †Stoveris
 †Stoveris achylosus
 †Stramentum
 †Stramentum elegans
 †Stramentum haworthi
 †Strepteneura
 †Striatriletes
 †Striatriletes radialis
  †Styxosaurus – type locality for genus
 †Styxosaurus snowii – type locality for species

T

 Tellina
 †Terminonaris
 †Terminonaris browni – or unidentified comparable form
  †Toxochelys
 †Toxochelys latiremis
 Trachycardium
 †Trachycardium kansasense
 †Tragodesmoceras
 †Tragodesmoceras bassi
  †Trinacromerum – type locality for genus
 †Trinacromerum bentonianum – type locality for species
 Turritella
 †Turritella belviderei
 †Turritella belviderensis
 †Turritella kansasensis
  †Tylosaurus
 †Tylosaurus dyspelor
 †Tylosaurus kansasensis – type locality for species
 †Tylosaurus proriger

U

  †Uintacrinus
 †Uintacrinus socialis
 †Urenchelys
 †Urenchelys abditus – type locality for species

V

 †Vitiphyllum

X

  †Xiphactinus
 †Xiphactinus audax

Y

 Yoldia
 †Yoldia microdonta

References
 

Mesozoic
Kansas